Raad Fanar, (born 25 March 1997 in Iraq) is an Iraqi defender who currently plays for Iraqi Premier League club Erbil SC.

International career
On 4 May 2018, Fanar won his first international cap with Iraq against Palestine in a friendly match.

International goals 
Scores and results list Iraq's goal tally first.

References

1997 births
Living people
Iraqi footballers
Association football defenders
Sportspeople from Baghdad
Iraq international footballers